

Air Force

Army Aviation Corps

Naval Air Arm

Indian Coast Guard

See also                                                                                                                          
 List of Indian naval aircraft
 Currently active military equipment by country
 List of pilot training institutes in India
 Military of India
 Indian Air Force
 Indian Naval Air Arm
 Future of the Indian Air Force
 Border Security Force

Notes

References

External links
The Official Home Page of Indian Air Force.

Indian Military Aircraft
Indian military-related lists
Active Indian military aircraft